The men's 50 kilometres race walk at the 2014 European Athletics Championships took place at the Letzigrund, Zürich, Switzerland on 15 August.

Medalists

Records

Schedule

Results

Final

References

Final Results

Race Walk 50 M
Racewalking at the European Athletics Championships